Mark Krikorian (born March 28, 1960) is an American sports executive and former soccer coach who is president of soccer operations and general manager of Washington Spirit.

A long-time college soccer coach, Krikorian is most well known being the head coach for the Florida State Seminoles women's soccer team from 2005 until his abrupt retirement from coaching in 2022. In 2014, Krikorian led the Florida State Seminoles women's soccer team to their first NCAA Women's Soccer Championship, where they defeated the Virginia Cavaliers 1-0. Krikorian previously coached at Franklin Pierce University and the University of Hartford.

Krikorian also served as head coach of Philadelphia Charge of the Women's United Soccer Association (WUSA), which ran for three seasons from 2001 until 2003. He was named WUSA Coach of the Year in 2002. In 2004, Krikorian coached the United States women's under-19 team to the 2004 FIFA U-19 Women's World Championship in Thailand.

Collegiate coaching record

Coaching honors
Franklin Pierce Ravens
NCAA Division II Women's Soccer Championship: 1994, 1995

Hartford Hawks
America East Tournament champions: 1997, 1998, 1999
America East regular season champions: 1997, 1998, 1999

Florida State Seminoles
NCAA Division I Women's Soccer Championship: 2014, 2018, 2021
ACC regular season champions: 2009, 2012, 2014, 2020
ACC Women's Soccer Tournament Champions: 2011, 2013, 2014, 2015, 2016, 2018, 2020, 2021

United States U-20
2004 FIFA U-19 Women's World Championship bronze medal: 2004

Individual
NSCAA Division II National Coach of the Year: 1992, 1995
Women's United Soccer Association Coach of the Year: 2002
TopDrawerSoccer.com National Coach of the Year: 2018
United Soccer Coaches College Coach of the Year: 2014, 2020

References

External links
WUSA Profile
Florida State University Profile

1960 births
Living people
American soccer players
Association football midfielders
Saint Anselm Hawks men's soccer players
American soccer coaches
American women's soccer coaches
Florida State Seminoles women's soccer coaches
Hartford Hawks women's soccer coaches
Women's United Soccer Association coaches
Pinkerton Academy alumni